The Act of Uniformity 1558 was an Act of the Parliament of England, passed in 1559, to regularise prayer, divine worship and the administration of the sacraments in the Church of England. The Act was part of the Elizabethan Religious Settlement in England instituted by Elizabeth I, who wanted to unify the church. Other Acts concerned with this settlement were the Act of Supremacy 1558 and the Thirty-Nine Articles.

Background
Elizabeth was trying to achieve a settlement after 30 years of turmoil during the reigns of Henry VIII, Edward VI and Mary I, during which England had swung from Roman Catholicism to Protestantism and back to Catholicism. The outcome of the Elizabethan Settlement was a sometimes tense and often fragile union of High Church and Low Church elements within the Church of England and Anglicanism worldwide.

The Act 
The Act set the order of prayer to be used in the Book of Common Prayer. All persons had to attend Anglican services once a week or be fined 12 pence (equal to about three days wages).

Repeal
On 27 September 1650, the Act was repealed by the Rump Parliament of the Commonwealth of England with the "Act for the Repeal of several Clauses in Statutes imposing Penalties for not coming to Church", but this Act was rendered null and void with the Restoration of the monarchy in 1660. Most of the Act was repealed by the Statute Law Revision Act 1888.

See also 
Acts of Supremacy
Acts of Uniformity
Conformist
Nonconformist
Religion in the United Kingdom
A View of Popish Abuses yet remaining in the English Church

Notes

References

External links
Act of Uniformity of 1559 (full text)
Image of original act from the Parliamentary Archives website

History of the Church of England
Book of Common Prayer
Acts of the Parliament of England concerning religion
1559 in law
1559 in England
Christianity and law in the 16th century
1559 in Christianity
1558 in Christianity
1558 in law
1558 in England
Reformation in Ireland